Deidamia inscriptum, the lettered sphinx, is a species of moth of the family Sphingidae. It is the only member of the genus Deidamia. The species was first described by Thaddeus William Harris in 1839 and the genus was erected by James Brackenridge Clemens in 1859.

Distribution 
It is found in North America from Florida to Mississippi, and in Michigan, Wisconsin, Ontario, Quebec and South Carolina.

Description 
The wingspan is 45–70 mm.

Biology 
The larvae feed on Vitis, Ampelopsis and Parthenocissus species.

References

External links

Deidamia inscriptum. Sphingidae of the Americas. Archived from the original May 12, 2012.

Macroglossini
Moths described in 1839
Moths of North America
Taxa named by Thaddeus William Harris